Leary is a city in Calhoun County, Georgia, United States. The population was 618 at the 2010 census. Jimmy Carter (US President 1977–1981) reported seeing an unidentified flying object while at Leary, Georgia in 1969.

Geography
Leary is located in southeastern Calhoun County at  (31.485431, -84.513293).

History 
On October 2, 1916, a woman named Connelly, whose son was accused of murder, was taken from the Leary jail and lynched.  Her body, riddled with bullets was found two days later.

Demographics

As of the census of 2000, there were 666 people, 256 households, and 176 families residing in the city. The racial makeup of the city was 21.47% White, 75.68% African American, 0.75% Native American, 1.35% from other races, and 0.75% from two or more races. Hispanic or Latino of any race were 2.85% of the population.

There were 256 households, out of which 29.3% had children under the age of 18 living with them, 31.6% were married couples living together, 31.3% had a female householder with no husband present, and 31.3% were non-families. 28.9% of all households were made up of individuals, and 9.4% had someone living alone who was 65 years of age or older.  The average household size was 2.60 and the average family size was 3.19.

In the city, the population was spread out, with 29.1% under the age of 18, 10.8% from 18 to 24, 24.2% from 25 to 44, 23.0% from 45 to 64, and 12.9% who were 65 years of age or older.  The median age was 37 years. For every 100 females, there were 79.5 males.  For every 100 females age 18 and over, there were 74.8 males.

The median income for a household in the city was $26,172, and the median income for a family was $28,942. Males had a median income of $24,063 versus $16,000 for females. The per capita income for the city was $14,426.  About 27.7% of families and 29.9% of the population were below the poverty line, including 45.4% of those under age 18 and 38.7% of those age 65 or over.

Notable people
 Chone Figgins, American baseball player, born in Leary

References

Cities in Georgia (U.S. state)
Cities in Calhoun County, Georgia